Leadership & Management Wales was an organisation funded by the Welsh Government and the European Social Fund to encourage the development of leadership and management skills among businesses in Wales. It was active between 2009 and 2014.

Background
It was formed in 2009 in response to a report entitled Skills That Work for Wales, and was run by a consortium, led by Cardiff Business School at Cardiff University, and also including Glyndwr University, Aberystwyth University, and Tattum Guest Associates. Its main office was in Cardiff, with others in Wrexham and Aberystwyth.

It was part of the Welsh Government's Workforce Development Programme and Enhancing Leadership and Management Skills (ELMS) programme. LMW ran events, conducts and commissions research, and provided online resources and information on funding and training courses.

LMW stated on its website that it was “formed to support businesses in developing their leadership and management development (LMD) skills, enabling them to increase efficiency and help grow the economy in Wales”.

References

External links

Maintaining Work Life Balance
Leadership Development Training

Education in Wales
Organizations established in 2009
2009 establishments in Wales
Wales